Anna Henriques-Nielsen (8 December 1881 – 24 December 1962) was a Danish stage and film actress. She appeared in 29 films between 1941 and 1958. She was born in Copenhagen, Denmark and died in Denmark.

Filmography

I folkets navn - 1938
Thummelumsen - 1941
Tak fordi du kom, Nick - 1941
Natekspressen - 1942
Når man kun er ung - 1943
Mordets melodi - 1944
Det kære København - 1944
Otte akkorder - 1944
Så mødes vi hos Tove - 1946
Ditte Menneskebarn - 1946
Ta', hvad du vil ha' - 1947
Den stjålne minister - 1949
Mosekongen - 1950
Bag de røde porte - 1951
Fra den gamle købmandsgård - 1951
Avismanden - 1952
Den gamle mølle på Mols - 1953
 We Who Go the Kitchen Route - 1953
Vores lille by - 1954
Himlen er blå - 1954
Færgekroen - 1956
Tre piger fra Jylland - 1957
Guld og grønne skove - 1958
Mor skal giftes - 1958
Vagabonderne på Bakkegården - 1958

References

External links

1881 births
1962 deaths
Danish stage actresses
Danish film actresses
Actresses from Copenhagen
20th-century Danish actresses